Geobotanical prospecting refers to prospecting based on indicator plants like metallophytes and the analysis of vegetation. For example, the Viscaria Mine in Sweden was named after the plant Silene suecica (syn. Viscaria alpina) that was used by prospecters to discover the ore deposits. 

A "most faithful" indicator plant is Ocimum centraliafricanum, the "copper plant" or "copper flower" formerly known as Becium homblei, found only on copper (and nickel) containing soils in central to southern Africa. 

In  2015, Stephen E. Haggerty identified Pandanus candelabrum as a botanical indicator for kimberlite pipes, a source of mined diamonds.

The technique has been used in China since in the 5th century BC. People in the region noticed a connection between vegetation and the minerals located underground. There were particular plants that throve on and indicated areas rich in copper, nickel, zinc, and allegedly gold though the latter has not been confirmed. The connection arose out of an agricultural interest concerning soil compositions. While the process had been known to the Chinese region since antiquity, it was not written about and studied in the west until the 18th century in Italy.

References

Citations

Books 
 Craddock, Paul T. Early Metal Mining and Production. Washington, D.C.: Smithsonian Institution Press 1995.

Economic geology
Phytogeography
Chinese discoveries